Yang Klon is a sub-district in the Nakhon Thai District of Phitsanulok Province, Thailand.

Geography
Yang Klon lies in the Nan Basin, which is part of the Chao Phraya Watershed.

Administration
The following is a list of the sub-district's mubans (villages):

References

Tambon of Phitsanulok province
Populated places in Phitsanulok province